Solanum capsicoides, the cockroach berry, known as polohauai'i in Polynesia, is a flowering plant in the family Solanaceae. It is native to eastern Brazil but naturalized in other tropical regions, where it sometimes becomes an invasive weed.

Synonyms
This species had been included in S. aculeatissimum as variety denudatum by Dunal (Solanum denudatum of Bitter is S. humile as described by Lamarck). It was also included in the eggplant (S. melongena) under its junior synonym S. trongum (as var. sinuato-pinnatifidum), also by Dunal.

In addition, the cockroach berry is sometimes referenced under the following obsolete names:
 Solanum arrebenta Vell.
 Solanum bodinieri H.Lév. & Vaniot
 Solanum capsicoides Hort. Paris ex Lam. (preoccupied)
 Solanum ciliare Willd.
 Solanum ciliatum Lam.
S. ciliatum of Blume from F.A.W. Miquel is an undetermined species of Lycianthes.
 Solanum ciliatum var. arenarium Dunal
S. arenarium of Schur is S. villosum as described by Philip Miller.
S. arenarium of Otto Sendtner is a valid species
 Solanum macowanii Fourc.
 Solanum pentapetaloides Roxb. ex Hornem.
S. pentapetaloides of Bojer from Dunal in de Candolle is S. imamense.
 Solanum pentapetalum Schltdl.
 Solanum sinuatifolium Vell.
 Solanum sphaerocarpum Moric.

References

Footnotes
  (2007): Solanum capsicoides. Version of 2007-MAR-21. Retrieved 2007-SEP-15.
  (2006): Solanum sessiliflorum. Version of May 2006. Retrieved 2008-SEP-26.

capsicoides
Taxa named by Carlo Allioni